Kay Benbow (born 1961) is a British broadcasting executive, and was the Controller of the BBC channel CBeebies from 2010 - 2017.

Early life
Kay Benbow was born in Sheffield. She studied Theology at St Hugh's College, Oxford, gaining her degree in 1980. She joined the BBC in 1984.

BBC Children's
Kay Benbow began working for BBC Children's in 1988. She moved to CBeebies in 2002. CBeebies launched in February 2002. During this time she also spent two years outside the BBC at Tell-Tale Productions until 2000. She became the second Controller of CBeebies in May 2010. In October 2014 Benbow became Acting Director of BBC Children's following the resignation of Joe Godwin, until the appointment of Alice Webb in February 2015.

Under her control, CBeebies has won the BAFTA Children's Award for Channel of the Year in 2010, 2011, 2013 and 2016.
In January 2017, she was awarded an honorary degree from Sheffield University in recognition of her achievements in the industry and her commitment to research-informed understanding of young children’s engagement with television. In July 2017, it was announced that the post of Controller of CBeebies would close and Benbow left the BBC at the end of that year.

Benbow said that she would, "leave with pride, knowing that CBeebies is in great shape, is loved by the audience and will go from strength to strength. I have always said that the very young deserve the very best and I have strived to give them just that. It is my hope that CBeebies inspires them and makes a positive impact on their lives, helping to create happy, confident children".

Personal life
Kay Benbow is married with two sons (born May 1994 and June 1998). She married Ian Stubbs in June 1991. Both of her sons attended John Hampden Grammar School in High Wycombe. She lives in South Bucks.

References

External links
 CBeebies

1961 births
Living people
Alumni of St Hugh's College, Oxford
BBC executives
People from Sheffield
People from South Bucks District